Neatsville is an unincorporated community in Adair County, in the U.S. state of Kentucky. It is located at the junction of Kentucky Route 206 and Kentucky Route 76. Its elevation is 705 feet (215 m). For unknown reasons, the town's name was spelled as Neetsville from 1876 until 1886, when the town's post office closed. In its early history from around the 1810s to 1900, Neatsville progressively grew to become a well-established, incorporated town. It has been relocated twice through the years, once due to flooding circa 1900–1902, which decimated the town, and once in the 1960s when the Green River was impounded to make way for the Green River Reservoir.

History
Various sources and accounts have referred to Neatsville as a village, as a postal village, as a hamlet and as a town at different times in its history.

The community was settled in the early 1800s by the Neats, with Randolph Neat being the first to acquire land there. As it expanded, the community grew to encompass several stores, a hotel, a doctor's office, mills, a sawmill, distilleries, a saloon, a salt works, a cooper shop, a carding machine, and a Masonic Lodge. It was incorporated as a town on February 23, 1847. Its post office was established on March 13, 1844, and closed in 1886. In 1848 the town's population was estimated to be around 50, and in 1876 the town's population was estimated at 60. The Masonic Lodge was relocated to Pellyton in 1917.

Relocations
Sometime circa 1900–1902, a significant flood decimated the town, necessitating its relocation from the north bank to the south bank of the Green River, at which time the former location was abandoned. Erosion had occurred in the foundations of the buildings in the former location due to the flooding. A 1916 local account of the town's former site after the flooding characterized it as "nearly obliterated" and "in ruins". Neatsville was later relocated to its present location sometime in the 1960s, when the Green River was impounded to enable the creation of the Green River Reservoir.

Notes

References

Unincorporated communities in Adair County, Kentucky
Unincorporated communities in Kentucky
Populated places established in the 1800s